Aristovo is a rural locality (a village) and the administrative center of Shemogodskoye Rural Settlement, Velikoustyugsky District, Vologda Oblast, Russia. The population was 620 as of 2002. There are 9 streets.

Geography 
Kuznetsovo is the nearest rural locality. The area surrounding the town has a record of geo-magnetic anomalies. The town can be found  Northwest of Moscow, which is the capital.

References 

Rural localities in Velikoustyugsky District